Erlend Blikra (born 11 January 1997) is a Norwegian racing cyclist, who currently rides for UCI ProTeam .

Major results
2013
 1st  Time trial, European Youth Summer Olympic Festival
2014
 1st  Time trial, National Junior Road Championships
 1st Overall Le Trophée Centre Morbihan
1st Points classification
1st Young rider classification
1st Stages 1 & 2 (ITT)
 1st Stage 2b Course de la Paix Juniors
 4th Overall Tour of Istria
1st Young rider classification
2018
 1st  Criterium, National Road Championships
2019
 Dookoła Mazowsza
1st Prologue, Stages 1 & 2
2020
 1st International Rhodes Grand Prix
 1st Stage 2 International Tour of Rhodes
2021
 1st Stage 3 Tour de la Mirabelle
 8th Overall A Travers les Hauts de France
2022
 Tour de Langkawi
1st  Points classification
1st Stage 6
 9th Elfstedenronde

References

External links

1997 births
Living people
Norwegian male cyclists
Sportspeople from Stavanger